Abbas Ali Khalatbari (1912 – 11 April 1979), also known as Abbas Ali Khal'atbari, was an Iranian diplomat, who served as the minister of foreign affairs from 1971 to 1978. He was among the significant diplomats who shaped the foreign relations of Iran during the reign of Mohammad Reza Pahlavi. He is one of the Shah era politicians who were executed following the Iranian revolution.

Early years and education
Khalatbari was born in 1912. He was a member of a well-established family.

He pursued his education Paris, where he received a degree in political science at the Faculty of Law and Economics of Paris in 1936, and a PhD degree in law in 1938.

Career
Khalatbari was a career diplomat. He began his career in the finance ministry in 1940 and then joined the foreign ministry in 1942. He briefly served as Iran's ambassador to Poland in 1961.

Khalatbari was appointed secretary general of CENTO in January 1962, replacing Mirza Osman Ali Baig in the post. Khalatbari was in office until January 1968 when Turgut Menemencioglu succeeded him in the post. From 1968 to 1970 he served as the deputy minister of foreign affairs.

Khalatbari was appointed foreign minister to the cabinet led by Prime Minister Amir Abbas Hoveyda on 13 September 1971, replacing Ardeshir Zahedi in the post. Khalatbari paid an official visit to Israel in 1977 as a guest of his Israeli counterpart Yigal Allon. Khalatbari's term as foreign minister ended on 27 August 1978, and he was replaced by Amir Khosrow Afshar in the post. Although being loyal to the Shah, Khalatbari learned his removal from the early morning radio news.

Later years and death
Following the 1979 Islamic revolution Khalatbari was arrested and sentenced to death on the charges of "corruption on earth; membership of the former regime, being a minister of the former government, being a SAVAK agent, being member of a government delegation acting against the interests of the nation; being employed by the CIA; treason, acting against the interest of the people, acting against the security of the nation". He and ten other officials of the Shah, including former agriculture minister Mansour Rouhani, were executed by the security forces of the Islamic Republic of Iran in Tehran on 11 April 1979. Shortly before his execution, a written statement of Khalatbari's reports in the court was issued, claiming that the ousted shah had "personally" killed many people.

Personal life
Khalatbari was married to the sister of Safi Asfia, who headed the Plan Organisation of Iran, and was in charge of Iran's early nuclear ambitions. He had four children.

Honors
Khalatbari was the recipient of Homayoun First Class and Taj Third Class honors.

References

External links

20th-century Iranian diplomats
20th-century Iranian politicians
1912 births
1979 deaths
Ambassadors of Iran to Poland
Central Treaty Organisation officials
Foreign ministers of Iran
Politicians executed during the Iranian Revolution
Rastakhiz Party politicians